Tunes 2011–2019 is the second compilation album by British electronic musician Burial. It was released by Hyperdub on 6 December 2019, and compiles Burial's solo EPs on the label.

Reception

The compilation received universal critical acclaim, garnering a Metacritic score of 96 based on 10 reviews.

The album's non-chronological track sequencing has been singled out by many publications for praise. Writing for Popmatters, Rod Waterman notes that it forces the listener "to think about" the music "across a significant period, rather than to react just to the release of a couple of songs at a time and to revel in the arrival of new Burial music. The juxtaposition of these tracks, and in the order Bevan has chosen here, suggests relationships and trajectories that might not have previously been apparent. It suggests further that Burial has been playing a very long game, with an artistic and emotional vision that is even more comprehensive than we might have imagined." Sam Richards of Uncut similarly notes that "the compilation is sequenced for flow", thus resulting in the emergence of "some unexpected shapes." A staff reviewer for Sputnikmusic characterized the album as an "epilogue", writing that it "instills a level of newfound confidence, of acceptance. Bevan, now Burial again, feels at home with no plot to course."

Others have praised the content of the compilation itself, with Pitchforks Gabriel Szatan considering the first half of the second disc to be "the apex of Burial's dancefloor material, truly as good as it gets." In a perfect score review, Damien Morris of The Observer hailed the album as a "compilation of rare bravery and beauty", and compared Burial to Banksy for his ability to communicate "poetic truths about the prosaic to the public." Eamon Sweeney of The Irish Times made a similar comparison, and wrote that the collection "constitutes arguably the finest compilation of the last 10 years."

Track listingNotes'''
 The album's CD release erroneously lists "Claustro" and "Rival Dealer" in swapped order.
 The digital release of Tunes 2011–2019'' has a slightly edited version of "Beachfires" with a duration of 9:10.

Charts

References

2019 compilation albums
Burial (musician) albums